Rokkk is a 2010 Indian horror film starring Tanushree Dutta and Udita Goswami. The movie is directed by Rajesh Ranshinge. It is based on supernatural thoughts and inevitable emotions. The movie does not contain any songs, but there was a soundtrack.

Plot
The story narrates two female protagonists Anushka (Tanushree Dutta) and Ahana (Udita Goswami). Ahana and Anushka are sisters. Anushka is married to an elderly man; Ravi (Sachin Khedekar). He is a widower and ties the knot with her after his first wife, Pooja's unknown and untimely death. Anushka's mother refuses to accept their marriage. The couple begin their journey in a new home purchased by Ravi 2 years ago. Anushka's life takes an unexpected twist. She tells this to her husband who thinks that she is only hallucinating and they decide to go back to their previous home, but the horror does not seem to stop in this house either. Anushka suspects that Pooja (Ravi's first wife) is behind all of these nerve-wracking incidents.

She seek the advice from a healer (Arif Zakaria) who tells her about the cursed house and that who ever will pass from the shadow of that house will be cursed and die a painful death. He gives her a Yantra which can only protect her and will not free her from the curse. When Ahana tries to discover the story behind the incidents her husband and sister-in-law get murdered; she is charged with the murders and taken to an asylum. She tries to reach her sister but she is unable to. By sensing a problem, Ahana starts a journey to reach her sister. In hotel where Ahana was staying she meets Ranvir (Shaad Randhawa) a CBI officer who is in charge of this case.

Ranvir informs her about the charge levied on Anushka and her escape in asylum. Ranvir and Ahana together refuse to follow the same path but their destination is Anushka. Now they are cursed by the shadow of the house in the journey. As they move further they also meet the same healer who helps them to unfold the mysteries behind the house. The story continues with thrill and excitement. It slowly reveals the secret behind the cursed house.

Cast

External links

2010 films
2010 horror films
2010 horror thriller films
2010s Hindi-language films
Indian horror thriller films